David Hughes (c. 1794 - 2 March 1862), known by his bardic name of Eos Iâl, was a Welsh poet and publisher. Hughes is known as the author of the plygain carol .

Early life
Hughes was born at "Brynllwynog", Bryneglwys near Corwen, Denbighshire and lived, from 1824 until 1831, a few miles away in Cynwyd, in the parish Llangar. He married twice, the first time to a girl from Cynwyd, with whom he had eight children, and who is buried at Llangar Church.  He lived in "Nhŷ yr Ardd", Pentre, a hamlet near Bryneglwys.  In his youth, he was fond of drink, but came under the influence of the evangelical temperance movement and soon was one of their leaders, becoming influential in the cause. He was an active member of the Oddfellows. He was a member at the Baptist church in Cynwyd and then at the Baptist church at Llansantffraid Glyn Dyfrdwy, where he is buried. He died aged 67.

Poet
In 1824 he won an Eisteddfod in Corwen and remained a keen competitor until 1835. In 1839 he published a volume of verse, which proved enormously popular.  says, of his 1839 collection: "Much of its content is of a popular appeal and of ephemeral value." The majority of his poems criticized the social and moral decay he saw during his lifetime.

Printing and publishing
In 1837 he built a wooden printing press at his home, acquired some moveable type from Thomas Thomas, a printer from Chester, and used it to print a few books and a number of carols and ballads.

Works published
"Ffrwyth y Profiad neu Waedd yn Erbyn Meddwdod" ("The Fruit of Experience or Tirade against Drunkenness") (pamphlet)
"Araith Beelsebub Tywysog y Fagddu Fawr" ("The Great Prince Beelzebub") (pamphlet)
"Udgorn y Jubili a'r Gynadledd" ("Trumpet of the Jubilee and Conference") (held by Bangor University Library)

See also
 (15 August 1815 - 15 February 1899)

References

Further reading

External links
  Parti Fronheulog: Carol Plygain: 'Ar Gyfer Heddiw'r Bore'
 "Ar gyfer heddiw'r bore" - lyrics, written by David Hughes

1794 births
1862 deaths
Welsh poets
People from Corwen
Welsh Baptist hymnwriters
19th-century Baptists